Ju-jitsu has been included in the Asian Games since the 2018 Asian Games in Indonesia.

Editions

Events

Medal table

Participating nations

List of medalists

References

External links 
2018 Ju-Jitsu Results Book

 
Sports at the Asian Games